Antarctoneptunea is a genus of sea snails, marine gastropod mollusks in the family Austrosiphonidae, the true whelks.

Distribution
Antarctoneptunea marine snails occur in deep water surrounding New Zealand and in Southern Ocean encircling Antarctica, particularly in the Ross Sea.

Evolution
Molecular phylogenetic trees based on mitochondrial genomic and nuclear ribosomal DNA sequence data indicate that Antarctoneptunea is closely related to the Northern Hemisphere genus Kelletia, and Penion siphon whelks found in waters surrounding New Zealand and Australia. It has been suggested that some Antarctic fossil species of Penion are misclassified Antarctoneptunea.

Species
Species within the genus Antarctoneptunea include:

 Antarctoneptunea aurora (Hedley, 1916)
 Antarctoneptunea benthicola (Dell, 1956)

Species brought into synonymy
 Penion benthicolus delli Powell, 1971: synonym of Antarctoneptunea benthicola (Dell, 1956)

References

External links
 Museum of New Zealand Te Papa Tongarewa, Taxon: Antarctoneptunea (Genus)

Austrosiphonidae
Monotypic gastropod genera